Luch may refer to:

Places
Luch (landform), an area of originally expansive, boggy lowland in northeast Germany
Luch (rural locality), several rural localities in Russia

Ukraine
Luch, Mykolaiv Oblast, village in Mykolaiv Raion
Luch, Sumy Oblast, village in Konotop Raion

Others
Luch (newspaper),  a Menshevik daily newspaper in Russia, published from 1912 to 1913
Luch (satellite), a series of Russian relay satellites
Luch (watch), a watch brand made in Minsk, Belarus
Luch Design Bureau, Ukrainian weapons manufacturer
Luch Stadium, a stadium in Gomel, Belarus

See also
FC Luch-Energiya Vladivostok, a soccer team based in Vladivostok, Russia
Luchs (disambiguation)